The Blue Moon is a tavern located on the west edge of the University District in Seattle, Washington, United States. It opened in April 1934, four months after the repeal of Prohibition, and has been visited by many counterculture icons over the years.

History

The tavern also provided a haven for UW professors who were caught up in the McCarthyist purge, such as Joe Butterworth, who used the bar as his writing desk. Its heyday continued into the 1950s and 1960s.  Regulars included authors Tom Robbins and Darrell Bob Houston, poets Theodore Roethke, Richard Hugo, Carolyn Kizer, Stanley Kunitz, and David Wagoner, and painters Richard Gilkey and Leo Kenney. Other visitors included Dylan Thomas, Ken Kesey, Allen Ginsberg and Mik Moore.

A popular story claims that sometime in the late 1960s, Tom Robbins tried to call the artist Pablo Picasso in Barcelona from a pay phone at the Blue Moon Tavern. Supposedly, Robbins got through to Picasso, but the artist refused to accept the overseas collect calling charges.

The Blue Moon declined in the 1970s. Efforts to "redevelop" the property in 1989 were derailed by community activists led by Walt Crowley; however, an attempt in 1990 to gain landmark status failed. Developers spared the tavern after landmark status was denied. The Blue Moon remains one of the few surviving blue-collar landmarks in Seattle.

In 1995, the alley to the west of the Blue Moon was named Roethke Mews in honor of the bar's famous patron Theodore Roethke. The business has been described as a dive bar.

See also 
List of dive bars
Public house
University District

References

External links
 
 Blue Moon Tavern page at the Stan Iverson Memorial Archives
A tour of the Blue Moon by Novelist-in-Residence Emeritus James Knisely

Buildings and structures in Seattle
Restaurants in Seattle
Tourist attractions in Seattle
University District, Seattle
1934 establishments in Washington (state)
Dive bars in Washington (state)